Blue Fleet may refer to:
Blue Fleet, NATO naval forces in a 1957 NATO exercise named "Operation Strikeback"
Blue fleet (Canada), civilian vehicles held by the Canadian Department of National Defence and the Canadian Forces